Tuber is a genus in the Tuberaceae family of fungi, with estimated molecular dating to the end of the Jurassic period (156 Mya). It includes several species of truffles that are highly valued as delicacies.

Species

According to the Dictionary of the Fungi (2008), this widespread genus contains 86 species.

New discoveries
In 2015 a new species Tuber petrophilum (close relative to Tuber melanosporum and Tuber brumale) was discovered in the Dinaric Alps (Southeastern Europe, Serbia). In 2016, two new species were discovered in Brazil. Tuber floridanum (with the commercial name Trufa Sapucaya meaning 'The last Guarany breath') and Tuber brennemanii grow in association with pecan rootlets.

References

External links
 

 
Pezizales genera